Agyneta okefenokee is a species of sheet weaver discovered in the United States. It can be found in the Okefenokee Swamp, Georgia. It was described by Dupérré in 2013.

Etymology
The name is a noun in apposition taken from the location Okefenokee Swamp.

References

okefenokee
Spiders described in 2013
Spiders of the United States